Inosperma calamistratum, until 2019 known as Inocybe calamistrata, is an inedible species of Inocybaceae fungus found in Europe and North America. Orson K. Miller Jr. and Hope Miller list it as poisonous. It used to be suspected of being psychotropic because of the blue-green tinge present at the stipe base, but psilocybin and similar alkaloids have not been found in the fruiting bodies.

References

Fungi of Europe
Inedible fungi
Taxa named by Elias Magnus Fries
calamistratum